Uğur Yıldırım (born 8 May 1982) is a Dutch football coach and former professional player. He especially impressed during his time with SC Heerenveen and became free kick world champion. After retiring, he began working as a coach at the Go Ahead Eagles youth academy.

He made one appearance for the Netherlands national team.

Club career
A freekick specialist, Yıldırım progressed through the Go Ahead Eagles youth academy. In the 2003–04 season he scored six goals in an Eerste Divisie match against Cambuur. This unique feat drew attention of bigger clubs and Yıldırım signed a contract at Heerenveen, with whom he had an outstanding debut season. In 2005, Yıldırım won a free kick tournament held in Marbella, beating out players such as Zinédine Zidane.

In July 2007, he signed a three-year contract with Turkish Süper Lig club Gaziantepspor. During his time at the club, he scored three goals for his team. He subsequently moved to title challengers Sivasspor after claiming that Gaziantepspor had not paid his wages for several months. His time in Sivasspor was disappointing and he left after only six months on a free transfer. After his unsuccessful stay in Turkey, Yıldırım had several trials in 2008, but failed to impress with English clubs Blackburn Rovers, Plymouth Argyle and Watford. He then trialled with Azerbaijani club Neftçi Baku and Dutch side FC Zwolle. The result of this unsuccessful period of trials was a eventually a contract with Kasımpaşa in January 2009 until the end of the season, where he was released in June 2009.

In August 2010 Yıldırım agreed to join Dutch Eerste Divisie side AGOVV, signing a one-year contract for the club from his native town. Afterwards, he began playing on amateur level with CSV Apeldoorn.

International career
After Yıldırım took the decision on 22 January 2005 to represent the Netherlands internationally – after having to choose between the Netherlands and Turkey. He gained his only international cap on 9 February 2005 against England. In the 64th minute he came on as a substitute for Feyenoord-player Romeo Castelen, as the game ended in 0–0 draw. As the match against England was a friendly, Yıldırım could still opt to play for Turkey.

Coaching career
After his playing career, Yıldırım began coaching teams in the Go Ahead Eagles youth academy while taking his coaching diploma. He also coached Vierde Klasse team TKA between 2017 and 2019. On 1 July 2020, he began coaching the Go Ahead Eagles U16 team.

References

External links
Profile at TFF

1982 births
Living people
Sportspeople from Apeldoorn
Dutch people of Turkish descent
Dutch footballers
Netherlands international footballers
Go Ahead Eagles players
SC Heerenveen players
Gaziantepspor footballers
Sivasspor footballers
Kasımpaşa S.K. footballers
AGOVV Apeldoorn players
Eredivisie players
Eerste Divisie players
Süper Lig players
Association football midfielders
CSV Apeldoorn players
Footballers from Gelderland
Dutch football managers
Go Ahead Eagles non-playing staff
TFF First League players